Sergio Lauricella (June 19, 1921 – May 2, 2008) was an Italian composer. He was born in Naples. In 1948 he won a bronze medal in the art competitions of the Olympic Games for his "Toccata per Pianoforte" ("Toccata for piano").

References

External links
 Sergio Lauricella's profile at Sports Reference.com

1921 births
2008 deaths
Italian composers
Italian male composers
Olympic bronze medalists in art competitions
Musicians from Naples
20th-century Italian musicians
Medalists at the 1948 Summer Olympics
20th-century Italian male musicians
Olympic competitors in art competitions